Marfori is a surname. Notable people with this surname include:
Andrea Marfori (born 1958), Italian film director
Antonio Marfori (1937–1974), Filipino pilot
Carlos Marfori (1821–1892), Spanish-Italian politician
Filippo Marfori Savini (1877–1952), Italian artist
Jose Maria Marfori (1939–2003), Filipino actor